Mastax louwerensi is a species of beetle in the family Carabidae with restricted distribution in the Indonesia.

References

Mastax louwerensi
Beetles of Asia
Beetles described in 1936